Chionodes eburata is a moth in the family Gelechiidae. It is found in Colombia.

The wingspan is 14–15 mm. The forewings are dark ashy-fuscous. The stigmata are black, obscure, with the plical rather obliquely before the first discal. There is a small cloudy white dot on the costa at three-fourths and sometimes one or two white scales on the upper part of the termen. The hindwings are dark grey.

References

External links
 

Chionodes
Moths described in 1917
Moths of South America